Ceraj is a surname. Within Slovenia, it is most prevalent in the region of Savinja.

Notable people with this surname include:

 Matjaž Ceraj (born 1983), Slovenian judoka
 Zdravko Ceraj (1920–2011), Croatian long-distance runner

References